Ludi Lin (born November 11, 1987) is a Canadian actor and model. He is known for playing Zack Taylor in the 2017 Power Rangers reboot, the underwater warrior Murk in Aquaman (2018), and Lance in a 2019 episode of the Netflix series Black Mirror. He plays Liu Kang in the Mortal Kombat reboot.

Personal life
Born in Fuzhou, China, Lin moved to Hong Kong at age 3. Then, he was sent abroad to boarding schools at age 9 in Sydney, Australia where he spent the bulk of his youth. His accent was different each time he moved, but he was considered as an outsider in Australia. "I had to fight a lot as a kid," Lin said, referring to how he learned street fighting just to defend his different accents. At age 17, he emigrated to Vancouver, Canada for university. He attended and graduated from the University of British Columbia with a double major in Dietetics and Theatre Performance. Lin also studied film and TV acting in Los Angeles. Lin currently resides in Vancouver and Beijing.

Lin is proficient in snowboarding as a competitive snowboarder, scuba diving, and martial arts. He studied Muay Thai in Thailand after graduating from high school, as well as Jiu-Jitsu and Olympic-style wrestling.

Lin is fluent in English, Mandarin, and Cantonese.

He became a vegan around 2016. In a video where he explains his dietary fundamentals on the Men's Health YouTube channel, Lin advocates a vegan diet saying "It's good for the Earth, it's good for my body, I feel good about it because animals are cute, and it is the only thing that is sustainable."

Lin is also a fan of comic books, manga, and anime. He is also an activist for Asian representation and speaking out against Asian racism with movements like Stop Asian Hate.

Career 
Lin started his acting career with short films and later landed his first major U.S. role in the movie, Power Rangers.

He had previously auditioned for Shang-Chi from the Marvel movie, Shang-Chi and the Legend of the Ten Rings and also for Spike Spiegel from the live action series, Cowboy Bebop. He is also mentioned that he is a fan of the anime.

Filmography

Film

Television

References

External links

Canadian male actors of Chinese descent
Canadian male film actors
Canadian male models
Chinese emigrants to Canada
Chinese male film actors
Canadian practitioners of Brazilian jiu-jitsu
Canadian jujutsuka
Living people
Male actors from Fuzhou
Naturalized citizens of Canada
University of British Columbia alumni
1987 births
Chinese male television actors
21st-century Chinese male actors